Arthur Coningham ( 14 July 1863 – 13 June 1939) was an Australian cricketer who played in one Ashes Test match at Melbourne in 1894 in which he took a wicket with his very first ball. He took 2 for 17 in England's first innings but failed to add to that tally in the second.

Biography
Coningham was born at Emerald Hill, Victoria in 1863. He was renowned as something of a joker.  In an effort to stay warm while fielding in a tour match in 1893 at a frigid Blackpool he gathered straw and twigs and started a fire on the outfield.

He found life difficult after he retired from the game, serving time in jail for fraud, and he died in an asylum. Coningham was involved in a famous scandal in 1899 when he sued his wife for divorce on the basis of her adultery with a Catholic priest, Fr Denis O'Haran, personal secretary to Cardinal Moran. The jury found against Coningham and the couple emigrated to New Zealand; in 1912, his wife divorced him for adultery.

His son was the World War I air ace and World War II commander Air Marshal Sir Arthur Coningham. Coningham died in 1939 and was buried in the Rookwood Cemetery.

References

External links
 

1863 births
1939 deaths
Australia Test cricketers
Queensland cricketers
New South Wales cricketers
Australian cricketers
Australian fraudsters
Australian people of Scottish descent
Cricketers from Melbourne
People from South Melbourne
Deaths in mental institutions
Burials at Rookwood Cemetery